The discography of Twins, a Hong Kong Cantopop duo that formed in 2001, consists of fifteen studio albums, three extended plays (EP), five compilation albums, and four live albums.

2001

2002

2003

2004

2005

2006

2007

2008

2010

2011

2012

Twins (group) albums
Twins
Pop music group discographies